Pécsvárad is a town in Baranya County, Hungary.

Notable landmarks
Among the most significant Hungarian heritage from the Middle Ages is the castle built on a Benedictine monastery commissioned by King St Stephen. The building complex is now used as a museum and a hotel.

Twin towns – sister cities

Pécsvárad is twinned with:

 Hausmannstätten, Austria
 Jur nad Hronom, Slovakia
 Külsheim, Germany 
 Pannonhalma, Hungary
 Satu Mare, Romania 
 Unterschleißheim, Germany 
 Velyki Berehy, Ukraine

Notable people
Endre Nemes (1909–1985), artist

Gallery

References

External links

  in Hungarian
 Aerial photography: Pécsvárad

Populated places in Baranya County
Romanesque architecture in Hungary
Hungarian German communities